Bosnian maple is a type of Acer platanoides, a European mountain maple indigenous to former Yugoslavia. It was a very high grade of maple, very light and very strong, according to some the best wood in the world for making violins, as it had the finest resonance. The classic Italian violin makers probably used wood from Tyrol, or northern Yugoslavia, or Switzerland. The maple has mostly been used for the back plates. It was used by the Gagliano family of luthiers.  Portuguese violin maker António Capela uses the Yugoslavian spruce and maple.

References

Sources

Maple
Bosnia (region)
Violins
Wood
Yugoslav culture